Fernand Le Borne (10 March 1862-15 February 1929) was a Belgian-French composer, conductor and music critic.

References 

1862 births
1929 deaths
French classical composers